The Daily Word is a daily inspirational message provided by Unity. Themes include inner peace, hope, healing, guidance, and others. It is distributed via print magazine, website, e-mail and through a mobile app.

History
Daily Word magazine has been continuously printed since 1924. In the early years, most of the messages were written by its first editor, Frank B. Whitney.

Daily Word in Braille began in 1934, and is available for free to the blind through Message of Hope. Daily Word in Spanish, La Palabra Diaria, was first published in March 1955. Daily Word in Large Type was introduced in 1978.

Among Daily Word'''s former editors are Colleen Zuck and Martha Smock. The magazine has featured articles contributed by many prominent thinkers, including Wayne Dyer, Naomi Judd, Mark Victor Hansen, Wally Amos, June Allyson, David Friedman, Appiani Stephen and Thomas Moore. Cartoonist Bill Keane has also contributed.Zuck, C., Wright, J., and Meyer, E. (199) Daily word for families: linking my heart with those I love. Rodale Press.

Notable readers
Oprah Winfrey says she starts each day reading Daily Word. Denzel Washington is also a reader of Daily Word''.

References

External links
 

Christian magazines
New Thought magazines
Unity Church
Magazines established in 1924
Bimonthly magazines published in the United States
Audio periodicals
Downloadable magazines
Magazines published in Missouri
1924 establishments in the United States